Glasgow International Jazz Festival is a jazz festival in Glasgow, Scotland.

Main Festival
The Glasgow International Jazz Festival is held annually in June in the  Merchant City area of Glasgow. The main, open-air stage is situated in George Square with the main internal base being the newly refurbished Old Fruitmarket, part of the City Halls complex.

Fringe Festival
Apart from the main festival, many bars, restaurants and hotels feature fringe artists as well as the main festival venues.

External links
Official site

See also
Culture in Glasgow

Music festivals in Scotland
Jazz festivals in the United Kingdom
Music in Glasgow
Tourist attractions in Glasgow
1989 establishments in Scotland
Annual events in Glasgow
Music festivals established in 1989
Festivals in Glasgow